The 2013 Ford EcoBoost 400 was a NASCAR Sprint Cup Series stock car race that was held on November 17, 2013, at Homestead Miami Speedway in Homestead, Florida. Contested over 267 laps, it was the thirty-sixth and final race in the 2013 NASCAR Sprint Cup Series, as well as the final race in the ten-race Chase for the Sprint Cup, which ends the season. Denny Hamlin won the race. Matt Kenseth finished second while Dale Earnhardt Jr., Martin Truex Jr. and Clint Bowyer rounded out the top five. Jimmie Johnson finished ninth to take his sixth Sprint Cup title.

This race marked Mark Martin's, Ken Schrader's and Tony Raines' final career start.

Results

Qualifying

Race

Statistics after the race 

Drivers' Championship standings

Manufacturers' Championship standings

Note: Only the first five positions are included for the driver standings.

References

Ford EcoBoost 400
Ford EcoBoost 400
Ford EcoBoost 400
NASCAR races at Homestead-Miami Speedway